Litman is a surname. Notable people with the name include:

 David Litman (born 1957), American technology chief executive
 Diane Litman, American professor of computer science
 Ellen Litman (born 1973), American novelist
 Eric Litman (born 1973), American entrepreneur and angel investor
 Jack Litman (1943–2010), American criminal defense lawyer
 Jessica Litman, American copyright law expert
 Juliet Litman, American journalist, editor, and media personality
 June Margaret Litman (1926–1991), New Zealand journalist
 Pepi Litman (c. 1874–1930), Yiddish vaudeville singer
 Scott Litman (born 1966), American entrepreneur from Minnesota

See also 
 Littmann
 Littman